The 2022 Danmark Rundt (officially PostNord Danmark Rundt 2022 for sponsorship reasons) was a men's road bicycle race which was held from 16 to 20 August 2022. It was the 31st edition of Danmark Rundt, which was rated as a 2.Pro event on the 2022 UCI Europe Tour and the 2022 UCI ProSeries calendars.

Teams 
Seven UCI WorldTeams, seven UCI ProTeams, six UCI Continental teams and the Danish national team (competing as Team Postnord Danmark) made up the twenty-one teams that participated in the race.

UCI WorldTeams

 
 
 
 
 
 
 

UCI ProTeams

 
 
 
 
 
 
 

UCI Continental Teams

 
 
 
 
 
 

National Teams

 Team PostNord Danmark

Schedule

Stages

Stage 1 
16 August 2022 – Allerød to Køge,

Stage 2 
17 August 2022 – Assens,  (ITT)

Stage 3 
18 August 2022 – Otterup to Herning,

Stage 4 
19 August 2022 – Skive to Skive,

Stage 5 
20 August 2022 – Give to Vejle,

Classification leadership table

Classification standings

General classification

Points classification

Mountains classification

Young rider classification

Active rider classification

Team classification

References

External links 
 

2022
Danmark Rundt
Danmark Rundt
Danmark Rundt
Danmark Rundt